Leonardo Fea (Turin 24 July 1852 – Turin 27 April 1903) was an Italian explorer, zoologist, painter, and naturalist.

Biography
Fea was born in Turin, a son of Paolo Fea, who was professor of painting at Accademia Albertina, and Anna Roda. In 1872 he became an assistant at the Museum of Natural History in Genoa. He made several foreign trips to collect specimens, including visits to Burma (1885–89) and the Cape Verde Islands (1898), the islands in the Gulf of Guinea (São Tomé, Príncipe, Fernando Po, Annobón, 1900–02) and Cameroon and French Congo (1902). He spent four years in Burma, accumulating large collections of insects and birds. He then planned an expedition to Malaysia, but his poor health made it necessary to choose somewhere with a drier climate, hence his visit to the Cape Verdes. He was disappointed by the amount of wildlife he found there, but was still able to collect forty-seven species of birds, eleven of which were new for the islands. His collections are in the Genoa museum.

While on the Cape Verde Islands Fea collected a specimen of an unknown petrel. This was named Fea's petrel in 1899 by his friend Tommaso Salvadori.

Taxa named in his honour
Several species have been named to commemorate his work as naturalist and zoologist:

Fea's short-legged toad, Brachytarsophrys feae 
Fea's viper, Azemiops feae 
Fea's muntjac, Muntiacus feae 
Fea's tube-nosed bat, Murina feae 
Fea's tree rat, Chiromyscus chiropus 
Fea's bow-fingered gecko, Cyrtodactylus feae 
Fea's petrel, Pterodroma feae 
Ugly worm lizard, Cynisca feae 
St. Thomas beaked snake, Letheobia feae 
Fea's chameleon, Trioceros feae 
the horseweed species Conyza feae 
the woodlice genus Feadillo

References

Further reading

Conci C (1975). "Repertorio delle biografie e bibliografie degli scrittori e cultori italiani di entomologia ". Mem. Soc. Ent. Ital 48 (4): 817–1069. (in Italian).
Conci C, Poggi R (1996). "Iconography of Italian Entomologists, with essential biographical data". Mem. Soc. Ent. Ital 75: 159–382.
Gestro A (1904). ["Fea, L."] Annali del Museo Civico di Storia Naturale di Genova, Third Series 1 (= 41): 95-152. (Portrait). (in Italian).
Nalesini O (2009). L'Asia Sud-orientale nella cultura italiana. Bibliografia analitica ragionata, 1475-2005. Rome: Istituto Italiano per l'Africa e l'Oriente. pp. 19–20, 65–66. . (in Italian).

External links

1852 births
1903 deaths
Painters from Turin
Italian explorers
Italian ornithologists
Italian entomologists
19th-century Italian painters
19th-century Italian male artists
Italian male painters
20th-century Italian painters
Italian painters of animals
Italian naturalists
Bird artists
Scientists from Turin
20th-century Italian male artists